On 5 February 2013, protests began in Shahbag, Bangladesh, following demands for the execution of Abdul Quader Mollah, who had been sentenced to life imprisonment and convicted on five of six counts of war crimes by the International Crimes Tribunal of Bangladesh (Abdul Quader Mollah allegedly helped Pakistan in 1971 for invading Bangladesh and prosecuted many Bengali Islamists involving in war crime. Zafar Iqbal continued to become a leader of the party Jamaat-e-Islami.). Later demands included banning the Bangladesh Jamaat-e-Islami party from politics including election and a boycott of institutions supporting (or affiliated with) the party.

Protesters considered Mollah's sentence too lenient given his crimes. Bloggers and online activists called for additional protests at Shahbag and joined the demonstration.

Ruling party Awami League supported the protests. However, the main opposition party, the Bangladesh Nationalist Party (BNP), initially expressed its support for Jamaat-e-Islami, a political ally. However, the BNP cautiously welcomed the Shahbag protest while warning the government to not exploit the situation for political gain from the movement demanding capital punishment for the war criminals. A counter-protest, questioning the validity of the tribunal and the protest movement and demanding release of those accused and convicted, was called by Jamaat-e-Islami.

During the protests, blogger Ahmed Rajib Haider was killed outside his house. On 1 March, five students of North South University were arrested, with those five confessing their involvement in Rajib's killing.

On 27 February 2013, the tribunal convicted Delwar Hossain Sayeedi of war crimes and sentenced him to death. Jamaat followers protested and there were violent clashes with police. About 60 people were killed in the confrontations; most were Jamaat-Shibir activists, and others were police and civilians.

The movement received considerable criticism in Bangladesh and from abroad for allegedly inciting violence and fascism by the use of slogans inciting violence. Death threats and calls for boycotts were made. It was accused of being politically motivated and was seen as disrupting public infrastructure.

Historical context

From partition of India in 1947 until 1971, Bangladesh was the part of Pakistan and was known as the East Pakistan. In 1971 East Pakistan fought West Pakistan for nine months. During this period the Indian Army which provided guerrilla training to Mukti Bahini, joined the war on 3 December 1971 in support of the liberation of East Pakistan. Armed conflict ended on 16 December 1971 through the surrender of the Pakistani Armed Forces to the joint force of Bangladesh and India in East Pakistan, resulting in the formation of the People's Republic of Bangladesh as an independent state.

According to the famous Blood telegram from the United States consulate in Dhaka (formerly known as 'Dacca') to the State Department, many atrocities had been committed by the Pakistan Army and its supporter Razakars and Al-Badar militia. Time reported a high-ranking US official as saying, "It is the most incredible, calculated killing since the days of the Nazis in Poland." Estimates are that one to three million people were killed, nearly a quarter of a million women were raped and more than ten million people fled to India to escape persecution.

A paramilitary force known as the Razakars was created by the May 1971 Razakar Ordinance promulgated by Tikka Khan, the governor of East Pakistan. The ordinance stipulated the creation of a volunteer force, trained and equipped by the provincial government. Razakar, originally meaning volunteer, became a derogatory term among Bangladeshis due to the widespread killings of civilians and atrocities committed by the paramilitary during the war.

The majority of East Pakistanis supported the call to create a free and independent Bangladesh during the Liberation War. However, Pakistani supporters and members of Islamic political parties, particularly Jamaat-e-islami(JIP) and its east Pakistan student wing Islami Chatra Sangha (ICS), the Muslim League, the Pakistan Democratic Party (PDP) Council and Nezam-e-Islami, collaborated with the Pakistani army to resist the formation of an independent Bangladesh. The students belonging to Islami Chatra Sangha were known as the Al-Badr force; people belonging to Jamaat-e-Islami Pakistan, Muslim League, Nizam-e-Islami and similar groups were called Al-Shams, and the Urdu-speaking people (generally known as Bihari) were known as Al-Mujahid.

After independence
In November 1973 Sheikh Mujibur Rahman issued a general pardon. However, Rahman banned all kinds of Islamic parties including the Bangladesh Jamaat-e-Islami. Eventually the ban was lifted, and under Ershad Jamaat-e-Islami participated in 1986 election. They got 10 seats with 4.6% vote. In the 1991 election, which was the first free and fair election after independence, Jamaat got 18 seats out of 300 and gained 12.2% of vote.

Against Ghulam Azam who was Amir of Jamaat-e-Islami, Jahanara Imam organized the Ghatak-Dalal Nirmul Committee (Committee for Eradicating the Killers and Collaborators of '71), and she become a public face. The committee called for the trial of people who committed crimes against humanity in the 1971 Bangladesh Liberation War in collaboration with the Pakistani forces. The Ghatak-Dalal Nirmul Committee set up mock trials in Dhaka on 26 March 1992 known as Gono Adalat (People's Court) and symbolically 'sentenced' persons they accused of being war criminals. Imam and others were reportedly charged with treason during the government of Bangladesh Nationalist party. In 1996 election, Jamaat's public support decreased and they got only 3 seats in that election.

In 2001 Election, BNP with 3 others parties including Jamaat-e-Islami wins the election. Jamaat got 17 seats. From 2001 to 2003, Amir of Jamat-e-Islami Motiur Rahman Nizami served as the Minister of Agriculture, then as the Minister of Industry from 2003 to 2006. And general secretary of Jamaat Ali Ahsan Mohammad Mojaheed served the Ministry of Social Welfare between 2001 and 2006.

International Crimes Tribunal (ICT) of 2010

Since 2000, there has been growing demands in Bangladesh for justice related to war crimes committed during the 1971 struggle; the issue was central to the 2008 general election. The Awami League-led, 14-party Grand Alliance included this issue in its election manifesto. Its rival, four-party alliance (which included the BNP and Jamaat-e-Islami) had several leaders alleged to have committed war crimes.

The Grand Alliance won the election (held on 29 December 2008) with a two-thirds majority, based in part on its promise to prosecute alleged war criminals.
On 29 January 2009 the new Parliament unanimously passed a resolution to prosecute war criminals. The government intended to use the 1973 law: the International Crimes (Tribunals) Act. The government worked to amend the law, updating it and incorporating in it other nations' experience. The amendments provided the legal basis for the trial of individuals and political parties that had committed war crimes during Bangladesh liberation war. The government was empowered to appeal tribunal decisions.

On 25 March 2010, the Awami-led government announced the formation of a three-member tribunal, a seven-member investigation agency, and a twelve-member prosecution team to conduct the trials under the ICT Act 1973. The panel of three judges included Fazle Kabir and Zahir Ahmed, with Mohammed Nizamul Huq as chairman. Abdul Matin, Abdur Rahim, Kutubur Rahman, Shamsul Arefin, Mir Shahidul Islam, Nurul Islam and M. Abdur Razzak Khan were appointed to assist the state prosecutors. Golam Arif Tipu was named Chief Prosecutor. Others prosecutors were Syed Rezaur Rahman, Golam Hasnayen, Rana Das Gupta, Zahirul Huq, Nurul Islam Sujan, Syed Haider Ali, Khandaker Abdul Mannan, Mosharraf Hossain Kajal, Ziad Al-Malum, Sanjida Khanom and Sultan Mahmud Semon.

Verdicts
A formal charge was filed by the prosecution against Abdul Quader Mollah on 18 December 2011. He was charged with:
 The Pallab murder
 Killing pro-liberation poet Meherunnesa, her mother and two brothers
 The Khandoker Abu Taleb killing
 The Ghatar Char and Bhawal Khan Bari killings
 The Alubdi mass killing (344 people)
 The rape and murder of Hazrat Ali and his family

On 5 February 2013, the ICT found Mollah guilty of crimes against humanity. He was sentenced to life imprisonment for the Alubdi and Ali killings and 15 years each for the Pallab, Meherunnesa and Taleb murders. The day before the verdict was announced, Bangladesh Jamaat-e-Islami (of which Mollah is a leader), announced a nationwide dawn-to-dusk general strike for 5 February in protest of their leader's conviction.

Many citizens (especially young people) were outraged that, given his crimes, Mollah was sentenced to life imprisonment rather than death. The verdict was criticised in social media, and a peaceful demonstration began at Shahbagh Square in Dhaka.

Protesters' demands
Over several days, protesters increased their demands, asking for:
 Death penalty for Mollah
 Death sentences for those convicted of war crimes by the International War Crimes Tribunal
 A ban of Jamaat from Bangladeshi politics
 A boycott of Jamaat institutions

Reading of oath

Development

Origins
Protest began right after the verdict was announced. Student organisations started the protest immediately after the Judgement in the Shahbag square that was the actual call for people to gather in the Shahbag square within half an hour of the Judgement. It took half an hour to spread out the call for protest through different social media and later the satellite TV channels. BOAN and some other social and cultural organisations called for different programmes in the same venue who later worked together. Demonstrators gathered at Shahbag Circle; they painted murals on the road, drew cartoons, hanged effigies of war-crimes suspects and chanted slogans, with a vow to continue demonstrating until their demands were met.

On 7 February, demonstrations began at 8 am. Thousands of people gathered with banners, posters, Bangladeshi flags and placards in Shahbag with their demands. On Friday afternoon, a mass rally was held at Shahbag with an estimated attendance of more than 100,000.

On 12 February, protesters observed three minutes of silence at 4 pm at Shahbag and all across Bangladesh. In Dhaka, traffic was stopped as thousands of people took to the streets, formed human chains and stood in silence. A Bangladesh Premier League game at the Sher-e-Bangla National Stadium halted for three minutes, as players and supporters observed the silence. Parliamentarians and the police also joined the protest. Bengali singer Kabir Suman wrote a song entitled "Tin Minit" ("Three Minutes") in honour of the silent protest.

Further developments
On 21 February, International Mother Language Day, the number of protesters reached a new high. Its leadership declared 26 March 2013, the Independence Day of Bangladesh, as the deadline for the government to ban Jamaat-e-Islami from politics.

The government did not ban Jamaat-e-Islam from politics after the deadline was over. Seven protesters calling themselves the Shaheed Rumi Squad began a fast until death on 26 March at 10:30 pm in front of the National Museum, protesting "inadequate government action" to ban Jamaat in response to the Shahbagh protesters' ultimatum. The fasters said at a press briefing that they would send an open letter to Prime Minister Hasina during the 100th hour of their protests. More than 100 organisations expressed solidarity with the hunger strikers.

Sentencing of Delwar Hossain Sayeedi

On 28 February the International Crimes Tribunal sentenced Delwar Hossain Sayeedi, Nayeb-e-Ameer (vice-president) of Jamaat-e-Islami, to death for convictions on 8 out of 20 charges of war crimes and crimes against humanity committed during the 1971 Bangladesh Liberation War. The protesters celebrated the sentence.

Counter-demonstrations

Jamaat followers were enraged by the decision, claiming that the case against Sayeedi was politically motivated. His lawyer, Abdur Razzaq, accused authorities of preventing a key witness from testifying and intentionally slanting the process. "This is a perverse judgment. It is inconceivable that a court of law awarded him a conviction. This prosecution was for a political purpose", Razzaq said. Jamaat quickly called for a nationwide two-day strike, to start on 3 March. By afternoon, violence led by Jamaat-e-Islami supporters had erupted across Bangladesh. "The Jamaat-e-Islami is fighting for its political survival", said a spokesperson. By the end of the day thirty-five people were dead, including three police officers; an additional eight hundred were injured. According to the BBC, it marked "the worst day of political violence in Bangladesh in decades".

Clashes between police and Jamaat-e-Islami workers continued on 1 March, spreading to the northern districts of Gaibandha and Chapai Nawabganj. Opposition leader Khaleda Zia criticised government "brutality" and Jamaat called for a demonstration in the capital, Dhaka. Security measures were increased to prevent the situation from escalating. The death toll rose to forty-four (including six policemen). Former prime minister and BNP member Khaleda Zia declared a nationwide dawn-to-dusk hartal for 5 March, and called for countrywide rallies on 2 March to protest what she called government corruption, misrule, oppression, and "mass killings".

Violent conflict continued on 2 March, with another four deaths and hundreds of injuries. In Chittagong district police opened fire on Jamaat-e-Islami protesters, leading to three deaths. In Nilphamari, a young person died in a clash between protesters and police.

On 3 March, violence continued as the Jamaat-organised strike began. In Bogra Jamaat supporters attacked police outposts with sticks and homemade bombs, leading to at least eight deaths. In Godagari two deaths were reported in a similar incident, and three deaths were reported in the Joypurhat district. Violence continued in Chittagong as well, where Jamaat claimed that police opened fire without provocation. The government denied the charge, saying that violence against citizens and police would not be tolerated; three deaths were reported. "People in the street are very, very afraid of Jamaat-e-Islam. I am scared", reported an eyewitness in Dhaka. Jamaat supporters were accused to attack the Hindu citizens and their homes in many parts of the country, and torching Hindu temples, which was denied by Jamaat-e-Islami. More than 40 temples and many statues were destroyed and scores of houses set ablaze, leaving hundreds of people homeless throughout the country.

Amnesty International has urged the Bangladeshi government to provide better protection for minority Hindus. Abbas Faiz, the organisation's Bangladesh researcher, has noted that the attacks on the Hindu community were predicted and it was shocking that people were attacked because of their religion. Attacks on Hindu communities had been widespread during the 1971 liberation war of Bangladesh. The Pakistani Army, Razakar and Al-Badar (organised by and are former militant political wings of Jamaat-e-Islami) were involved in committing atrocities against the Hindu minority in East Pakistan (Bangladesh).

The Islamist pressure group Hefazat-e-Islam Bangladesh, has accused several protesters of the Shahbagh of lampponing Muhammad, and making pornographic depictions of him.

Reactions

Domestic response

The Shahbag protest has attracted people from all social strata to its cause. The Shahbag intersection at the center of the protests has been referred to as "Generation Circle" ( Projônmo Chôttor) or "Shahbag Square", in a nod to the events which unfolded in Tahrir Square, Cairo. The protest spread from Shahbag to other parts of the country, with sit-ins and demonstrations in Chittagong, Rajshahi, Khulna, Sylhet, Barisal, Mymensingh, Rajbari, Rangpur, Comilla, Bogra, Narayanganj, Sunamganj, Noakhali and Narsingdi.

Political response
State Minister for Law, Quamrul Islam, said that the verdict against Abdul Quader Mollah could have been different if people had taken to the streets sooner. The government is planning to file appeals with the Supreme Court contesting the sentence for Mollah. On 11 February the Cabinet approved proposed amendments to the International Crimes (Tribunals) Act 1973, introducing a provision for plaintiffs to appeal verdicts handed down by the tribunal. This amendment, if passed, would enable the state to appeal Mollah's life sentence.

Jamaat-e-Islami, which was already staging protests against the impending trial of its leaders, called for a general strike. Jamaat continues to demand that the international war crimes tribunal be stopped and its party leaders freed. Jamaat supporters had staged nationwide demonstrations with increasing frequency from November 2012 to February 2013, demanding the release of its leaders. Actions included firing gunshots, smashing and setting fire to vehicles and detonating homemade bombs. Violence was targeted at police stationed in the capital, Dhaka, and major cities such as Rajshahi, Cox's Bazar, Chittagong, Rangpur, Dinajpur and Khulna. Several Jamaat-Shibir activists were arrested during the strikes and confrontations with police.

Reaction from Bangladeshis abroad

Bangladeshis abroad have expressed solidarity with the protests through social media websites Facebook and Twitter. Demonstrations of solidarity have also taken place in Australia, Malaysia, Germany, and the United States.

Bangladeshis in New York City joined in a symbolic protest on 9 February at Diversity Plaza in Jackson Heights. A mass sit-in was organised by the Bangladeshi community in Sydney on 10 February at the International Mother Language Monument in Sydney Ashfield Park. At a rally at the Angel Statue in Melbourne, demonstrators signed a petition to Bangladeshi Prime Minister Sheikh Hasina demanding death for war criminals. Bangladeshis in Taiwan also expressed their solidarity with the Shahbag protests on 10 February.

On 10 February, Bangladeshi students gathered at Rutgers University in New Jersey to express solidarity with the Shahbag protests. Bangladeshi residents joined the students to express their support. Bangladeshi students at the University of Delaware and nearby residents demonstrated their solidarity with the Shahbag movement on 15 February at a busy intersection in Newark, Delaware. A candlelight vigil was held that evening for Rajib, a blogger and activist who was killed several hours before the demonstration.

In London, protesters at Altab Ali Park in solidarity for Shahbag were attacked by Jamaat-e-Islami supporters. Protests are held at the park every week by both sides.

International response
On 18 February British Foreign Office minister Sayeeda Warsi hailed the Shahbag Square protests, describing them as peaceful, productive and non-violent. An article in the Fletcher Forum of World Affairs by Suzannah Linton on 27 February expressed concern about "bloodlust in Bangladesh" and called on the international community to steer the process towards international standards. William Nicholas Gomes, human rights activist and journalist criticised the shahabg protests. Indian government supported this movement from the first place.

Media coverage

Domestic
In Sreemangal, Moulvibazar cable operators in solidarity with the protests have stopped broadcasting the pro-Bangladesh Jamaat-e-Islami television channel Diganta Television.

International

The BBC News, CNN, Yahoo! News, Reuters, Al Jazeera, The New York Times, The Independent and others have published stories on the protests; BBC Bangla has been closely following the events. Reuters photographer Andrew Biraj published "live" photos of mass demonstrations at Shahbag.

Social media

Facebook had played an important role in spreading news worldwide about events at Shahbag. A Facebook event was created calling for a protest at Shahbag; the human chain which went viral on 5 February 2013.
Facebook was one of the main sources of information about Shahbag protest among its activists.

Bangladeshis used the Twitter hashtag "#shahbag" to provide live updates of the movement.

Outcome

The demonstration put pressure on the government to amend the International Crimes Tribunal Act so war criminals "can be swiftly executed if convicted". The cabinet also set a 60-day limit for the Supreme Court's Appellate Division to rule on appeals, to keep the cases moving. This means that those who have been convicted and sentenced to death could be executed this year if their verdicts survive appeal. In response to popular protests, Jute and Textiles Minister Abdul Latif Siddiqui said on 12 February that a bill is being drafted to ban Jamaat-e-Islami from Bangladeshi politics.

On 17 September 2013, Bangladesh Supreme Court found Abdul Quader Molla guilty of murders and other war crimes and ordered his execution, executed on 12 December 2013.

Controversy

Slogans inciting violence and cancel culture
During the movement, protesters used various slogans. These included "Ekta ekta Shibir dhor, dhoira dhoira jobai kor." ("Catch Shibir activists one by one, and slaughter them."), "Rajakarer chamra, kutta diya kamra." ("Make dogs chew on the skin of razakars."), among others, which were accused of promoting violence. Threats were made against academic Piash Karim for his stance against the tribunals. Boycotts and death threats were announced against Asif Nazrul, Farhad Mazhar and Motiur Rahman Chowdhury.

Political motivations
Since the International Crimes Tribunal's inception on 25 March 2010, of the 83 people tried 52 were sentenced to death and 31 people were not. Those not sentenced to death included only three Jamaat leaders. The remainder included BNP leaders, former Awami League activists etc. The protests began when Jamaat leader Abdul Quader Mollah was not sentenced to death, due to the sentiment that war criminals deserves capital punishment. Even after the verdict of Ghulam Azam's 90-year sentence, a 24-hour nationwide strike was called in protest. Notably however, there were minimal protests when non-Jamaat leaders were not given death sentences. Consequently, critics say the protests were not motivated by seeking justice for victims of war crimes, but rather by the desire to see Jamaat's leaders hanged, Jamaat-e-Islami banned from politics, and Jamaat institutions 'boycotted', indicating the protests were politically motivated in nature.

Government sponsoring
The ruling party Awami League fully supported the protests, with the police helping in blocking roads until they ended. Security forces allegedly spent thousands of taka every day towards the leaders, and criticized opposition leader Begum Khaleza Zia and the Bangladesh Nationalist Party on multiple occasions. Members of Awami League's student wing Bangladesh Chhatra League joined the demonstrations too. Critics claim the movement was partially created by the government itself to gain public support for hanging Jamaat leaders to consolidate its power 42 years after the war.

Violating dead bodies
On 25 October 2014, after the funeral of Golam Azam, a Shahbag movement's leader named Mahmudul Haque Munshi attempted to hurl a shoe at the vehicle carrying the coffin of Golam Azam, for which he was praised by fellow protesters. A number of critics opposed this however, condemning the action as promoting hatred and violence.

Vandalizing hospitals, banks and educational institutions
Shahbag protesters called for boycotting Jamaat-supported/sympathising institutions such as Islami Bank and Retina Coaching Centre. Eventually, many protesters vandalized and attacked those institutions too.

Enforced participation
Bangladesh Chhatra League were accused of enforcing students from various residential halls of the University of Dhaka to join the rally.

Accusations of censorships and fascism 
Protestors called for boycotting media outlets that did not support their views, including Diganta Television, Daily Naya Diganta, Amar Desh, and The Daily Sangram, which are newspapers and television networks that criticised the Awami League government. Eventually, the government banned Diganta Television on 6 May 2013. The Acting Editor of the Amar Desh newspaper, Mahmudur Rahman, was arrested on 11 April 2013, with the government closing down the newspaper.

Critics accuse it of promoting a "fascist" brand of Bengali nationalism.

Use of under-aged children
Protesters were accused of encouraging under-aged children to join in on the violent slogans as a means of accruing sympathy and public support.

Blocking the Hospital Road
Shahbag is home to many hospitals, including many of the largest ones of the city such Bangabandhu Sheikh Mujib Medical University, BIRDEM General Hospital and Ibrahim Medical College. The blockage of this important and sensitive road by protesters for more than a month was accused of causing significant patient suffering.

Timeline

 5 February - Abdul Quader Molla is sentenced to life imprisonment. Initial gathering of protesters in Shahbag Square (also known as Shahbag Circle).
 6–7 February - Protests intensify, crowds grow bigger, other cities and towns pick up protest. Bangladeshi diaspora and student communities abroad also begin to express solidarity with the protest.
 8 February - Hundreds of thousands attend afternoon rallies in Shahbag and nationwide. Dr Muhammed Zafar Iqbal and others address the crowds.
 9–10 February - Protest continues countrywide.
 12 February - 3-minute silence is observed in Shahbag and all across the country. Shibir attempts to disrupt with a mid-day rally which quickly turns violent as they use guns and bombs against police.
 15 February - Protester and blogger Ahmed Rajib Haider is killed. Haider had actively participated in the protest from the beginning and had written several blogs against Jamaat-e-Islami activities.
 16 February - Thousands of people from all professions gather at Shahbag wearing black badges to show their respect on the death of Ahmed Rajib Haider. By touching the coffin, protesters swear not to return home leaving their demands unfulfilled.
 17 February - Various schools in Dhaka hoist the national flag and sing the national anthem to express solidarity with Shahbag protesters. The Shahbag activists announce a "grand rally" to be held on 21 February and reiterate their demand of death penalty for war criminals.
 18 February - The Shahbag protest continues for the 14th day. Khelafat Andolon and Islami Oikya Jote demand the death penalty for top bloggers (Omi Rahman Pial, Ibrahim Khalil, Arif Jebtik and Asif Mohiuddin) of the ongoing Shahbag movement.
 19 February - British foreign office minister Baroness Sayeeda Warsi praises the Shahbag Square protest, describing it as peaceful and productive. Shahbag protesters vow to spread their movement to the grassroots level by making 'Gonojagoron Mancha' (mass-upsurge stage) like Shahbagh square at every corner of the country.
 20 February - Alleged "smear campaign" against Shahbag activists, branding them as atheist, anti-Islamic and anti-social elements by appealing to the religious sentiments of the people and at the same time trying to brand Haider as an atheist to justify his murder. This could have stemmed from allegations against members of the protestors who had made pornographic depictions of Muhammad.
 21 February - After the movement ran for two weeks, with huge participation from masses of people, in the grand rally at Shahbagh held on 21 February 2013 in the afternoon, Dr. Imran H Sarker presents six demands before the people. An intelligence agency releases a message to the news media and law enforcement agencies which states that some "anti-state elements" will try to carry out destructive activities including suicide bomb attacks on places like Shahbag, Shaheed Minar and Baitul Mukarram. Law enforcement agencies arrest several Jamaat-e-Islami leaders and Shibir activists carrying explosives and planning to attack Shaheed Minar.
 22 February - Shahbagh Ganajagaran Mancha calls for nationwide protest just 1 day after calling off their demonstration at Shahbagh. This happens after Jamaat activists went on a rampage in Dhaka city, clashing with police and attacking them with bombs and stones. Jamaat activists destroy the Sylhet Central Shaheed Minar setting on fire the national flag of Bangladesh and flowers. Thousands of students and people angered by this vandalism attacked and set fire to some institutions owned by and linked to Jamaat-e-Islami in Sylhet city.
 6 March - The Shahbag protest has completed one month. What started from the bloggers and online activists, has turned into a mass uprising, spread across the country to people from all walks of life, and among the expatriate Bangladeshis.

Photos

See also

 Timeline of the 2013 Shahbag protests
 Movement demanding trial of war criminals
 2013 Operation at Motijheel Shapla Chattar
 2018 Bangladesh quota reform protests
 2018 Bangladesh road safety protests
 Neo-fascism

References

External links
 #shahbag
 Shahbag Protest 2013
 Bangladesh Genocide Archive

2013 in Bangladesh
Protests in Bangladesh
2013 protests
Student protests in Bangladesh
Aftermath of the Bangladesh Liberation War
War crimes in Bangladesh
February 2013 events in Bangladesh